Domingo Díaz Arosemena (25 June 1875, in Panama City – 23 August 1949) was Panamanian politician.

Díaz Arosemena served as Mayor of Panamá District from 1910 to 1912, and he was elected as the first presidential designate by the National Assembly for the term 1932–1934.

He served as President of Panama from August 7, 1948 to July 28, 1949. He suffered a heart attack while in office and resigned, dying less than a month later. He belonged to the Liberal Party.

References

1875 births
1949 deaths
Mayors of places in Panama
People from Panama City
Presidents of Panama
Vice presidents of Panama
National Liberal Party (Panama) politicians